The LXII Legislature of the Congress of Mexico met from September 1, 2012, to August 31, 2015. All members of both the lower and upper houses of the Congress were elected in the elections of July 2012.

Senate elections

The Institutional Revolutionary Party & the allied Green Party failed to gain a simple majority in either house. As a result, the PRI will have to form crossparty coalitions in order to pass key reforms, particularly those requiring constitutional amendments. In the July, 2012 elections the PRI gained 2 seats, ending with 52. The PAN gained 5 seats, ending with 38. The PRD lost 1 seat, ending with 22. The PVEM gained 1 seat, ending with 9. The Labor Party lost 1 seat, ending with 4. The PANAL lost 3, ending with 2 seats. The MC lost 3 seats, ending with 1.

Senators

By state

Plurinominal Senators

Chamber of Deputies elections

The Institutional Revolutionary Party lost 32 seats, ending with 207. The PAN lost 28 seats, ending with 114. The PRD gained 31 seats, ending with 100. The Green Party gained 11 seats, ending with 34. The PT gained 6 seats, ending with 19. The New Alliance gained 3 seats, ending with 10. The Citizens Movement gained 10 seats, ending with 16. 1 independent seat was lost, and now there are none in the Chamber of Deputies.

Deputies

By relative majority election

Plurinominal Deputies

References

See also 

 Category:Deputies of the LXII Legislature of Mexico

Congress of Mexico by session